The Ghost and the Darkness is a 1996 American historical adventure film  directed by Stephen Hopkins and starring Val Kilmer and Michael Douglas. The screenplay, written by William Goldman, is a fictionalized account of the Tsavo man-eaters, a pair of male lions that terrorized workers in and around Tsavo, Kenya during the building of the Uganda-Mombasa Railway in East Africa in 1898.

The film received mixed reviews and grossed $75 million against a production budget of $55 million. It won the Academy Award for Best Sound Editing for supervising sound editor Bruce Stambler.

Plot
In 1898, Robert Beaumont, the primary financier of a railway project in Tsavo, Kenya, seeks out the expertise of Lt. Colonel John Henry Patterson, an Anglo-Irish British military engineer, to get the project on schedule. Patterson travels from England to Tsavo, promising his wife, Helena, that he will complete the bridge and be back in London for the birth of their child. Shortly after his arrival, he meets British supervisor Angus Starling, Kenyan foreman Samuel, and Doctor David Hawthorne. Hawthorne informs Patterson of a recent lion attack that has affected the undertaking.

That same night, Patterson ends the life of an approaching lion with a single gunshot, earning the respect of the laborers and allowing them to resume their activities safely. Only a few weeks after, however, Mahina, the construction foreman, is dragged from his tent. At sunrise, his mutilated body is recovered, and Patterson tries another night-time hunt, seeking to catch the lion that ate Mahina, but in the morning, he is informed by Starling that the corpse of a second worker has been found at the opposing end of the camp from his position.

Patterson, heeding the advice of Samuel, employs the workers in building thorn fences around the tents in order to prevent any lions from entering. Several days later, in broad daylight, a lion assails the camp, killing another worker. As Patterson, Starling, and Samuel corner the lion while it is feasting on the body, another lion leaps upon them from the roof of a building, slicing Starling across the throat and injuring Patterson on the left arm. Patterson recovers and attempts to shoot them, but both lions escape. Samuel states that there has never been a pair of man-eaters before; they have always been solitary hunters.

The workers, led by a man named Abdullah, begin to turn on Patterson and, consequently, progress on the bridge comes to a halt. Patterson requests soldiers from England as protection, but he is denied. During a brief visit to the site, Beaumont threatens Patterson that, should his commission not be concluded on time, he will tarnish his reputation. He also announces that he will be contacting the famed hunter Charles Remington to help Patterson in eliminating the threat due to his past failures.

A short time later, Remington reaches Tsavo with the company of skilled Maasai warriors, who dub the lions "the Ghost" and "the Darkness" because of their notorious methods. Remington’s initial attempt to trap one lion in a thicket fails when Patterson's borrowed gun misfires. The warriors decide to leave, daunted by the beast, but Remington elects to stay behind. He constructs a new hospital tent for sick and injured workers and tempts the lions to the abandoned building with animal parts and blood. The man-eaters seemingly fall for the trap, but Remington and Patterson shoot at them, and they retreat to the new hospital, slaughtering many patients and Hawthorne.

Abdullah and the workers depart, leaving Patterson, Remington, and Samuel alone. The former two locate the animals' lair and discover the bones of dozens of victims, leading Remington to the realization that the lions are acting as they have been merely for sport. Back at camp that evening, Patterson mounts a hunting stand in a clearing and lures one of the predators to his position using a baboon as bait. The plan goes awry after Patterson falls from the stand, but Remington manages to slay the feline before it can leap on Patterson. He, Patterson, and Samuel spend the remainder of the night drinking and celebrating, but the next morning, Patterson awakes to find that the remaining lion has devoured Remington as he and Samuel slept.

The two men cremate Remington’s remains and burn the tall grass surrounding the camp, driving the surviving lion toward the trap that they have set there. It ambushes them on the partially constructed bridge and, after a lengthy chase, Patterson finally dispatches it with a double-rifle Samuel has thrown to him from a nearby tree. Abdullah and the workers return, and the bridge is completed on time. Patterson reunites with his wife and meets his son for the first time.

Cast

 Michael Douglas as Charles Remington
 Val Kilmer as Colonel John Henry Patterson
 John Kani as Samuel
 Brian McCardie as Angus Starling
 Bernard Hill as David Hawthorne
 Tom Wilkinson as Sir Robert Beaumont
 Emily Mortimer as Helena Patterson
 Om Puri as Abdullah
 Henry Cele as Mahina

Production 
The film is based upon The Man-Eaters of Tsavo by Lieutenant Colonel John Henry Patterson, the man who actually killed both real lions.

Screenplay
William Goldman first heard about the story when travelling in Africa in 1984, and thought it would make a good script. In 1989 he pitched the story to Paramount as a cross between Lawrence of Arabia and Jaws, and they commissioned him to write a screenplay which he delivered in 1990.

"My particular feeling is that they were evil," said Goldman of the lions. "I believe that for nine months, evil popped out of the ground at Tsavo."

The script fictionalizes Patterson's account, introducing an American big game hunter called Charles Remington. The character was based on Anglo-Indian big game hunter Charles H. Ryall, superintendent of the Railway Police. In original drafts the character was called Redbeard, and Goldman says his purpose in the story was to create an imposing character who could be killed by the lions and make Patterson seem more brave; Goldman says his ideal casting for the role would have been Burt Lancaster.

According to Goldman, Kevin Costner expressed interest in playing Patterson, but Paramount wanted to use Tom Cruise who ultimately declined. Work on the film slowed until Michael Douglas moved his producing unit with partner Steven Reuther, Constellation Films, to Paramount. Douglas read the script and loved it, calling it "an incredible thriller about events that actually took place." Douglas decided to produce and Stephen Hopkins was hired to direct.

Val Kilmer, who had just made Batman Forever and was a frequent visitor to Africa then expressed enthusiasm for the script, which enabled the project to be financed.

The part of Remington was originally offered to Sean Connery and Anthony Hopkins but both declined; the producers were considering asking Gérard Depardieu when Douglas decided to play the role himself. Stephen Hopkins later said he was unhappy about this.

In early drafts of the script, Remington was originally going to be an enigmatic figure but when Douglas chose to play him, the character's role was expanded and was given a history. In Goldman's book Which Lie Did I Tell?, the screenwriter argues that Douglas' decision ruined the mystery of the character, making him a "wimp" and a "loser".

Locations
The film was shot mainly on location at Songimvelo Game Reserve in South Africa, rather than Kenya, due to tax laws. Many Maasai characters in the film were actually portrayed by South African actors, although the Maasai depicted during the hunt were portrayed by real Maasai warriors who were hired for the movie.

Filming
While the real man-eaters were, like all lions from the Tsavo region, a more aggressive, maneless variety, those used for filming were actually the least aggressive available, for both safety and aesthetic reasons. The film's lions were two male lions with manes. They were brothers named Caesar and Bongo, who were residents of the Bowmanville Zoo in Bowmanville, Ontario, Canada, both of whom were also featured in George of the Jungle. The film also featured three other lions: two from France and one from the USA.

Director Stephen Hopkins later said of the shoot:
We had snake bites, scorpion bites, tick bite fever, people getting hit by lightning, floods, torrential rains and lightning storms, hippos chasing people through the water, cars getting swept into the water, and several deaths of crew members, including two drownings.... Val came to the set under the worst conditions imaginable. He was completely exhausted from doing The Island of Dr. Moreau; he was dealing with the unfavorable publicity from that set; he was going through a divorce; he barely had time to get his teeth into this role before we started; and he is in nearly every scene in this movie. But I worked him six or seven days a week for four months under really adverse conditions, and he really came through. He had a passion for this film.

Reception

Box office
During its opening weekend, The Ghost and the Darkness grossed $10.3 million. The film ultimately grossed over $38.6 million domestically, and $75 million worldwide.

Critical response
The film won the Academy Award for Best Sound Editing (Bruce Stambler) at the 69th Academy Awards. However, Val Kilmer was nominated for the Razzie Award for Worst Supporting Actor. Reviews were mixed, with Rotten Tomatoes giving it a 50% rating based on 52 reviews. The site's consensus states: "The Ghost and the Darkness hits its target as a suspenseful adventure, but it falls into a trap of its own making whenever it reaches for supernatural profundity." Metacritic, which uses a weighted average, assigned the film a score of 46 out of 100, based on 26 critics, indicating "mixed or average reviews".

Roger Ebert said the film was so awful it "lacked the usual charm of being so bad it's funny" adding it was "an African adventure that makes the Tarzan movies look subtle and realistic". Ebert would put the film on his list of the worst movies of 1996. Conversely, the late David R. Ellis listed this film at #8 on his "Top 10 Animal Horror Movies" countdown, a list he made to promote the release of Shark Night 3D.

Hopkins said in a 1998 interview that the film "was a mess... I haven't been able to watch it."

Home media
The Ghost and the Darkness was released by Paramount Home Video on DVD on December 1, 1998.

On May 10, 2022, Shout! Factory issued The Ghost and the Darkness on Blu-Ray in a new 4K scan.

Historical accuracy

Although Patterson claimed the lions were responsible for up to 135 deaths, a peer-reviewed paper on man-eating lions and the circumstances surrounding this notorious event states that about 28–31 killings can be verified (Kerbis Peterhans & Gnoske, 2001). However, one underlying assumption of the study was that the lions would eat all of the edible meat on a victim. In other words, the study's conclusion was that the lions ate the equivalent of 28-31 whole people. This obviously does not take into account that some victims may have been killed and either partially eaten or not eaten at all.

Patterson's 1907 book itself states that "between them (the lions) no less than 28 Indian coolies, in addition to scores of unfortunate African natives of whom no official record was kept" were killed. This lesser number was confirmed in the definitive paper on man-eating behavior and the Tsavo lions by Kerbis Peterhans and Gnoske (2001) and soon thereafter in Dr. Bruce Patterson's definitive book The Lions of Tsavo: Exploring the Legacy of Africa's Notorious Man-Eaters published by McGraw-Hill in 2004. Kerbis Peterhans & Gnoske showed that the greater toll attributed to the lions resulted from a pamphlet written by Col. Patterson in 1925, stating "these two ferocious brutes killed and devoured, under the most appalling circumstances, 135 Indian and African artisans and laborers employed in the construction of the Uganda Railway."

The location where the bridge was built is now called Man-Eater's Camp.

See also
 Bwana Devil (1952)
 Mrugaraju
 The Man-Eaters of Tsavo, by J. H. Patterson

References
Notes

Bibliography

External links
 Chicago Field Museum – Tsavo Lion Exhibit
 The Ghost and the Darkness at Internet Movie Database
 
 The Ghost and the Darkness at Virtual History

1996 films
1990s adventure films
American adventure films
1990s English-language films
Films based on non-fiction books
American buddy action films
Films directed by Stephen Hopkins
Films with screenplays by William Goldman
Films set in Kenya
Films set in the British Empire
Films set in 1898
Films shot in South Africa
Films about lions
Films about hunters
Films scored by Jerry Goldsmith
Films that won the Best Sound Editing Academy Award
Paramount Pictures films
Films produced by Gale Anne Hurd
1990s American films